This is a list of areas of existing old-growth forest which include at least  of old growth. Ecoregion information from "Terrestrial Ecoregions of the World".

(NB: The terms "old growth" and "virgin" may have various definitions and meanings throughout the world. See old-growth forest for more information.)

Africa

Australia

In Australia, the 1992 National Forest Policy Statement (NFPS) made specific provision for the protection of old growth forests. The NFPS initiated a process for undertaking assessments of forests for conservation values, including old growth values. A working group of state and Australian Government agencies took the NFPS definition into consideration in developing a definition that was accepted by all governments (JANIS 1997). 

In 2008, only a relatively small area (15%) of Australia's forests (mostly tall, wet forests) had been assessed for old-growth values.

Almost half of Australia's identified old-growth forest is in NSW, mostly on public land. More than 73% of Australia's identified old-growth forests are in formal or informal nature conservation reserves.

In 2001, Western Australia became the first state in Australia to cease logging in old-growth forests.

The term "old-growth forests" is rarely used in New Zealand, instead, "The Bush" is used to refer to native forests. There are large contiguous areas of forest cover that are protected areas.

Eurasia

North America

Canada

United States

Central America

Caribbean

South America

See also

List of oldest trees
Old-Growth Forest Network

Notes

References

Lists of forests

Forestry-related lists